Isles-lès-Villenoy is a commune in the Seine-et-Marne department in the Île-de-France region in north-central France.

Demographics
Inhabitants are called Insuvilais.

History
Isles-lès-Villenoy has existed at least since the Merovingian period, and according to legend, Charles the Simple had a castle there. The village became significant when a toll bridge over the river Marne was built in 1839. At that point, the town became a holiday destination. In 1924, Isles-lès-Villenoy was attached to the canton of Meaux.

See also
Communes of the Seine-et-Marne department

References

External links

1999 Land Use, from IAURIF (Institute for Urban Planning and Development of the Paris-Île-de-France région) 

Communes of Seine-et-Marne